is a replica castle in Iwakuni, Yamaguchi, Japan. The nearby Kintai Bridge was originally a footbridge over the Nishiki River to the main gate of the castle.

History
This castle was originally constructed by Kikkawa Hiroie from 1601 to 1608 as his own castle. Kikkawa was a retainer of a vassal of the Shōgun under the Mōri clan. However, this castle was dismantled as per the Ikkoku-ichijo (一国一城, literally, "One Castle Per Province") order established by the Tokugawa Shogunate in 1615. 

After the destruction of the castle, Kikkawa used a part of the old castle as his residential office. The Kikkawa clan held this castle and Iwakuni Han, which was assessed at 30,000 (later 60,000) koku.

A replica of the castle tower built in 1962 now stands high on a hill above the Nishiki River and the Kintai Bridge. The castle was selected to be one of the 100 Great Castles of Japan by the Japan Castle Foundation in 2006.

Further reading

References

External links

 Iwakuni City Tourism
 Iwakuni Kankou.com

Castles in Yamaguchi Prefecture
100 Fine Castles of Japan
Mōri clan
Iwakuni, Yamaguchi